Smisby is an ancient manor, civil parish and small village in South Derbyshire, England.
The village including the outlying farms and houses has a population just over 200 that occupies some 110 properties. The population at the 2011 Census had increased to 260.

Early history
Smisby (Old Norse Smith's farm or settlement) is mentioned as Smidesbi in 1086 in the Domesday Book, which states under the title of "The lands of Nigel of Stafford":

The Smisby lock-up is a village lock-up dating from the 18th century. Considered the best exemplar of the type in the county, it is a Grade II* listed building.

Notable residents
 Hannah Bailey, an early emigrant to New Zealand, was born here on 2 February 1802. She married Charles Baker [later Rev.] of Packington on 11 May 1827 at St Mary's Church Islington, London, before leaving for the Mission fields in Bay of Islands, New Zealand, where they served as Missionaries to the Māori from 1828 until their deaths in 1875.
Reuben Bosworth the clockmaker was born here around 1797.

Ivanhoe
Within 200 metres of the village is a spot where a tournament was held that was described by Sir Walter Scott in his novel Ivanhoe. In chapter seven the text reads

This quotation is attributed to a visit Scott made to Coleorton Hall to visit Sir George Beaumont. They visited Smisby and climbed a now-demolished watchtower. Scott noted that a flat area towards Ashby Castle, but within Derbyshire, was reputed to be the place where ancient jousting tournaments had taken place.

Gallery

See also
Listed buildings in Smisby

References

External links

 Smisby local site
 Smisby Village Hall

Villages in Derbyshire
Civil parishes in Derbyshire
South Derbyshire District